The SABCA S.11 or SABCA S.XI was a prototype Belgian airliner of the 1930s. It was a three-engined high-winged monoplane intended for service in the Belgian Congo, but only a single example was built.

Design and development
In 1926, the Belgian government issued a specification for an all-metal trimotor airliner to replace the wooden Handley Page W.8 biplanes used by Belgian airline SABENA in the Belgian Congo. To meet this requirement, Sociétés Anonyme Belge de Constructions Aéronautiques (SABCA) offered a high-winged monoplane, the S.XI, designed by Henri Jullien, its chief engineer, which was intended to fly in 1928.

The S.XI had a fuselage constructed of welded-steel tubing, covered by fabric. The crew of three (two pilots and a navigator) were accommodated in an enclosed cockpit ahead of the wing, while the aircraft's cabin had seats for up to 20 passengers. The wings had steel spars with Duralumin ribs and covering, and were braced by steel struts. The aircraft's tail assembly was made of Duralumin. It was powered by three Bristol Jupiter radial engines, rated at  each, with one mounted in the nose and the other two on the leading edge of the wing, each driving two-bladed propellers. The aircraft had a fixed conventional landing gear.

Although it was expected to be completed in 1928, the prototype was not ready until 1931, making its first flight on 12 August 1931. As a result of testing, the aircraft was fitted with a lengthened rear fuselage with a modified tail of similar design to that used by the SABCA S.12. The type was soon abandoned, with no production following.

Specifications

References

External links

Photo

1930s Belgian airliners
SABCA aircraft
Trimotors
High-wing aircraft
Aircraft first flown in 1931